Erich Seidl (born 11 March 1960) is an Austrian weightlifter. He competed in the men's middle heavyweight event at the 1984 Summer Olympics.

References

1960 births
Living people
Austrian male weightlifters
Olympic weightlifters of Austria
Weightlifters at the 1984 Summer Olympics
Place of birth missing (living people)
20th-century Austrian people